Le Nouvion-en-Thiérache (literally Le Nouvion in Thiérache) is a commune in the Aisne department, region of Hauts-de-France (formerly Picardy), northern France.

Personalities
 Kamini (born 1979), rapper, comedian and screenwriter

Population

See also
 Communes of the Aisne department

References

Thiérache
Communes of Aisne
Aisne communes articles needing translation from French Wikipedia